Killian Sardella (born 2 May 2002) is a Belgian professional footballer who currently plays as a right back for Anderlecht in the Belgian First Division A.

Personal life
Sardella was born in Belgium to an Italian father and Congolese mother.

Career statistics

References

External links

2002 births
Living people
Belgian footballers
Belgium youth international footballers
Belgian people of Italian descent
Belgian people of Democratic Republic of the Congo descent
R.S.C. Anderlecht players
Belgian Pro League players
Association football defenders